American League Park, known by historians as American League Park I, was a baseball park that formerly stood in the Trinidad neighborhood of Washington, D.C., at the corner of Florida Avenue and Trinidad Avenue NE on land previously belonging to the Washington Brick Company. It hosted the Washington Senators from the 1901 season through the 1903 season.

The ballpark's left-field fence would become Neal Street NE; its third-base line ran along Trinidad Avenue; its first-base line ran along Florida Avenue NE; and its right-field fence ran along present-day Bladensburg Road. 

On March 20, 1901, the district commissioners granted permission to the American League to establish a baseball park at the location following an application including plans and specifications for the grand stand and the other supporting structures. Snowden Ashford was the building inspector who handled the case. Therefore, it was considered that it would not cause more menace to the area then if a lumber yard was established there. No specific regulations for the establishment of baseball grounds were in place in the District of Columbia at the time. No opposition from nearby landowners was received, therefore permission was granted.

The grandstands were made out of wood as most ballparks of the time.

Boundary Field, in Northwest DC, had been the preferred site for the American League Senators, but its usage had been blocked by the National League, which still had rights to the site despite no longer having a franchise in Washington. Once peace was reached between the leagues, the Senators moved to that site for the 1904 season, which became known as American League Park II or National Park. The stands from American League Park I were transported to the new location along with the team. By 1907, there was no longer a baseball field on the site.

References

Baseball venues in Washington, D.C.
Defunct baseball venues in the United States
Defunct Major League Baseball venues
Defunct sports venues in Washington, D.C.
History of Washington, D.C.
Near Northeast (Washington, D.C.)